Het Dorp is a neighborhood or village in the Netherlands near Arnhem.  The phrase "het dorp" literally means "the village".

References

Populated places in Gelderland